The Plymouth Post Office is a historic one-story building in Plymouth, Wisconsin. It was designed in the PWA Moderne by supervising architect Louis A. Simon, and built in 1941. Inside, there is a mural by Charles W. Thwaites depicting cheese making, the main industry in Plymouth. The building has been listed on the National Register of Historic Places since October 24, 2000.

References

1941 establishments in Wisconsin
Government buildings completed in 1941
National Register of Historic Places in Sheboygan County, Wisconsin
Post office buildings on the National Register of Historic Places in Wisconsin